Loodi Landscape Conservation Area is a nature park situated in Viljandi County, Estonia.

Its area is 3485 ha.

The protected area was designated in 1992 to protect landscapes and nature of Viljandi Parish. In 2006, the protected area was redesigned to the landscape conservation area.

References

Nature reserves in Estonia
Geography of Viljandi County